Dileesh Nair (born 23 July 1981) is an Indian film director and screenwriter who works in Malayalam cinema. He started out as a 2D animator. He made his script writing debut with Salt N' Pepper (2011) along with Syam Pushkaran. He debuted as film director with Tamaar Padaar (2014).

Personal life
Dileesh Nair was born in Thodupuzha, Kerala. He worked as a 2D animator for clients in Australia and the Middle East based out of Kochi.

Film career
Dileesh Nair penned the script for Salt N' Pepper with his friend Syam Pushkaran. Salt N’Pepper’s Telugu, Tamil and Hindi remake rights have been bought by actor-film director Prakash Raj. In 2012, he wrote the script for Da Thadiya (2012); another film directed by Aashiq Abu; along with Syam Pushkaran and Abhilash S Kumar. He also wrote script for the movie Idukki Gold (film) (2013). He has also appeared in cameo roles in films such as 22 Female Kottayam, Da Thadiya, Idiots.

He made his directorial debut with Tamaar Padaar starring Prithviraj Sukumaran, Baburaj, Chemban Vinod Jose and Srinda Ashab in pivotal roles. The film received a mixed response from the audience and critics.

Filmography

As director

As Script Writer

As actor

Awards

References

External links
 
 

1981 births
Malayalam film directors
Malayalam screenwriters
Indian male screenwriters
Living people
People from Idukki district
Screenwriters from Kochi